Penile pain refers to pain in the penis of human or otherwise.

Common causes 
 Penile injury
 Circumcision
 Penile fracture
 Priapism
 Phimosis
 Peyronie's disease
 Sexually transmitted infections
 Chronic prostatitis/chronic pelvic pain syndrome

Cultural references 
Priapus, a minor Greek god of fertility, is marked by his oversized, permanent erection, which gave rise to the medical term priapism. 

Some researchers believe the depiction of Priapus' penis referred to a penile disease, and that paintings of Priapus were used to ward off the disease.

See also 
 Genital pain
 Vaginal pain
 Testicular pain

References 

pain
Pain